Dylan Mattingly (born March 18, 1991) is an American composer from Berkeley, California.

Early life
Mattingly was born on March 18, 1991, in Oakland, California. He is a member of the Los Angeles-based musical family of the Allers/Altschulers, which includes Modest Altschuler, Eleanor Aller, Leonard Slatkin, and Judith Aller, among others. His grandmother was the painter Gladys Aller. His father is the poet George Mattingly.

Mattingly holds a BA in Classics and a BM in Music Composition from Bard College & Conservatory of Music, where he studied with George Tsontakis, Joan Tower, John Halle and Kyle Gann. He holds an MM in Music from the Yale School of Music where he studied with Martin Bresnick, Christopher Theofanidis, and David Lang.

Career

Mattingly was the co-director of Formerly Known as Classical in San Francisco for two years—a youth-run new music organization which played only music written within their lifetimes, and is currently the co-artistic director and cellist of Contemporaneous, a new music ensemble based in New York “dedicated to performing the most exciting music of this generation.” Contemporaneous has released an album on INNOVA Records, entitled Stream of Stars—Music of Dylan Mattingly.

Various performance groups have featured Mattingly's work, including the Los Angeles Philharmonic, Cabrillo Festival Orchestra, and the Berkeley Symphony. Several solo artists and small ensembles have performed his work as well, including Soovin Kim, Ignat Solzhenitsyn, Sarah Cahill (pianist), Geoffrey Burleson, Mary Rowell, Other Minds, Symphony Parnassus, the Da Capo Chamber Players, and the Del Sol String Quartet.

Mattingly has received commissions from the Albany Symphony Orchestra, Zofo Duet, & the Norfolk Chamber Music Festival (2016); the Los Angeles Philharmonic Orchestra, pianists Sarah Cahill (pianist) & Kathleen Supove (2015); Cabrillo Festival of Contemporary Music & Contemporaneous (2014); The Berkeley Symphony, Del Sol Quartet, John Coolidge Adams and Deborah O’Grady for the Cabrillo Festival Orchestra (2012).

Works

La Vita Nuova (and other consequences of Spring), commissioned by Colin Davin and Emily Levin, premiered June, 2017.
for guitar and harp
15'

After The Rain, commissioned by F-Plus, premiered January 6, 2017.
for clarinet, vibraphone, and violin.
8'

Ecstasy, commissioned by the Norfolk Chamber Music Festival, premiered August, 2016.
for SATB Choir, oboe, clarinet, trumpet, vibraphone, piano, 2 violins, viola, cello, bass
8'

Delphinium, commissioned by the Albany Symphony, premiered in June, 2016.
for soprano, flute, oboe, clarinet, vibraphone, harp, violin, viola, cello, bass
6'

Magnolia, commissioned by ZOFO, premiered May 10, 2016.
for piano four hands
6'

Achilles Dreams of Ebbets Field, commissioned by Kathleen Supové, premiered November 21, 2015 at the DiMenna Center, New York, NY.
for solo piano
105'

Seasickness and Being (in love), commissioned by the Los Angeles Philharmonic, premiered May 26, 2015 at Disney Hall, Los Angeles, CA.
for chamber orchestra
15'

Y E A R, commissioned by Sarah Cahill and the Ross McKee Foundation in honor of Terry Riley's 80th birthday, January 29, 2015.
for solo piano
15'

Sky Madrigal, commissioned by the Cabrillo Festival of Contemporary Music, August 2014.
for orchestra
15'

The Bakkhai, commissioned by Contemporaneous and the Bard College Classics Program, December 2013.
for 3 sopranos, tenor, 2 oboes, cello, bass, re-tuned piano, 2 percussion
30'

Gone, Gone, Gone, commissioned by the Del Sol Quartet, December 2012.
for string quartet
15'

Invisible Skyline, commissioned by the Berkeley Symphony, December 2012.
for orchestra
30'

I Was a Stranger, commissioned by John Adams and Deborah O'Grady for the Cabrillo Festival of Contemporary Music, August 2012.
for orchestra
10'

Atlas of Somewhere on the Way to Howland Island, commissioned by Contemporaneous, September 2011.
for chamber orchestra
36'

A Way A Lone A Last A Loved A Long the Riverrun, commissioned by Contemporaneous, May 2010.
for bassoon, violin, cello, bass, percussion
15'

Lighthouse (Refugee Music by a Pacific Expatriate), commissioned by Contemporaneous, March 2010.
for amplified string quintet
12'

Nobody, Not Even the Rain, Has Such Small Hands, for the Da Capo Players, December 2009.
for flute, clarinet, violin, cello, piano
9'

Dreams and False Alarms, August 2009. 
for two pianos, one tuned down a quarter-tone
20'

References

Further reading
Interviews:

https://van-us.atavist.com/into-the-sky
http://prufrocksdilemma.wordpress.com/2012/11/12/this-composing-life-composer-dylan-mattingly/
http://www.soundnotion.tv/tag/dylan-mattingly/

Press:

http://www.mercurynews.com/music/ci_26264764/review-cabrillo-festival-unleashes-bela-fleck-mattingly-norman
http://classicalvoiceamerica.org/2015/05/28/next-on-grand-festival-salutes-american-creators/
http://www.sfgate.com/music/article/Cabrillo-Festival-review-Bluegrass-fusion-fails-5665867.php
http://www.mercurynews.com/ci_22076885/young-berkeley-composer-dylan-mattingly-unveils-works-symphony
http://www.sfgate.com/music/article/Composer-Dylan-Mattingly-hits-stride-at-21-4093849.php
http://www.mercurynews.com/ci_22147635/5-things-know-about-composer-dylan-mattinglyhttp://prufrocksdilemma.blogspot.com/2011/09/dylan-mattinglys-american-vernacular.htmlhttp://classicalmodernmusic.blogspot.com/2012/05/dylan-mattingly-stream-of-stars.h http://www.mercurynews.com/ci_22147635/5-things-know-about-composer-dylan-mattingly
http://www.mercurynews.com/ci_22147635/5-things-know-about-composer-dylan-mattinglyhttp://prufrocksdilemma.blogspot.com/2011/09/dylan-mattinglys-american-vernacular.htmlhttp://classicalmodernmusic.blogspot.com/2012/05/dylan-mattingly-stream-of-stars.h http://prufrocksdilemma.blogspot.com/2011/09/dylan-mattinglys-american-vernacular.html
http://www.mercurynews.com/ci_22147635/5-things-know-about-composer-dylan-mattinglyhttp://prufrocksdilemma.blogspot.com/2011/09/dylan-mattinglys-american-vernacular.htmlhttp://classicalmodernmusic.blogspot.com/2012/05/dylan-mattingly-stream-of-stars
http://www.sfgate.com/music/article/Invisible-Skyline-review-Whoosh-4100923.php
https://www.sfcv.org/reviews/berkeley-symphony/berkeley-symphony-cheers-to-kaleidoscopic-fare
https://www.sfcv.org/reviews/del-sol-string-quartet/del-sol-shines-light-on-new-music
http://newsle.com/article/0/54713574/
http://prufrocksdilemma.blogspot.com/2012/04/into-dazzling-air.htm

External links 
 dylanmattingly.com
 hotairmusic.tumblr.com/post/465963234/why-is-new-music-relevant-dylan-mattingly
 http://www.contemporaneous.org/

Musicians from California
Musicians from Berkeley, California
American male composers
21st-century American composers
American multi-instrumentalists
Living people
Postminimalist composers
1991 births
21st-century American male musicians